Edward J. Barrett (March 10, 1900 – April 4, 1977) was an American politician.

Born in Chicago, Illinois, Barrett served in the United States Army during World War I in Europe from 1917 to 1920. He then went to Spaulding Institute and then received his bachelor's degree from Mayo College of Commerce. He worked in advertising and sales and was involved in organized labor in Chicago.

In 1932, he was elected Illinois Treasurer as a Democrat. In 1934, Barrett was elected Illinois Auditor of Public Accounts and served until 1940.

In 1941, he joined the United States Marine Corps and served as Sergeant in the South Pacific during World War II.

In 1942, he ran unsuccessfully for Illinois Treasurer. In 1944, Barrett was elected Illinois Secretary of State. Reelected in 1948, he served until after his defeat in 1952.

In 1955, Barrett was appointed Cook County Clerk to replace Richard J. Daley who was elected Mayor of Chicago. Barrett served until 1973, when  was convicted of bribery, mail fraud, and income tax evasion. He was sentenced to three years in prison and fined $15,000 dollars, but was allowed house arrest because of ill health. Barrett died at Veterans Administration Hospital Lakeside, in Chicago, Illinois at age 77.

Notes

1900 births
1977 deaths
Politicians from Chicago
Businesspeople from Chicago
Military personnel from Illinois
Illinois Democrats
State treasurers of Illinois
Auditors of Public Accounts of Illinois
Secretaries of State of Illinois
Cook County Clerks
Illinois politicians convicted of crimes
20th-century American businesspeople
20th-century American politicians
United States Army personnel of World War I
United States Marine Corps personnel of World War II
United States Marine Corps non-commissioned officers